This is a list of wars and conflicts involving the Republic of Cameroon and its previous states.

Pre-Colonial Cameroon (Before 1882)

Colonial Cameroon (1882–1961)

Republic of Cameroon (1961–Present)

References

Citations

Bibliography 

 
 
 
 
 
 
 
 
 

 
Cameroon
Wars